Novoanninsky District is an administrative district (raion), one of the thirty-three in Volgograd Oblast, Russia. As a municipal division, it is incorporated as Novoanninsky Municipal District. It is located in the northwest of the oblast. Its administrative center is the town of Novoanninsky. Population:  41,611 (2002 Census);  The population of the administrative center accounts for 48.0% of the district's total population.

References

Notes

Sources

Districts of Volgograd Oblast